The Pirate of the Black Hawk is a 1958 international co-production film starring Brigitte Bardot's sister Mijanou Bardot. The film was a co-production between Italy's Emmepi Cinematografica and France's Comptoir Français du Productions.

Cast
Mijanou Bardot as Eleanor
Gérard Landry as Richard
Andrea Aureli as Manfred
Ettore Manni as Johnny
Pina Bottin as Eva
Eloisa Cianni as Stella
Germano Longo as Mark
Andrea Miano as Bearded Pirate
Nazzareno Zamperla as Pirate with Ambassador Francesa (uncredited)

Release
The Pirate of the Black Hawk was released in Italy on 13 November 1958. The film was distributed in the United States by Filmgroup. It was released in the United States in December 1961. The film was shot in color, but released in black-and-white when distributed in the United States. It was released by Anglo Amalgamated in Great Britain in May, 1961, in full Supercinescope and Technicolor.

Footnotes

References

External links 

1958 films
1958 adventure films
Films directed by Sergio Grieco
Italian adventure films
Pirate films
French adventure films
Films set in the Mediterranean Sea
1950s Italian films
1950s French films